Meet Joe Black is a 1998 American romantic fantasy film  directed and produced by Martin Brest, and starring Brad Pitt, Anthony Hopkins, and Claire Forlani. Celebrating his 65th birthday, businessman and devoted family man Bill Parrish is visited by Death, who wants to know what it's like to be human in return for giving Bill extra days of his life. The screenplay was written by Bo Goldman, Kevin Wade, Ron Osborn, and Jeff Reno, and is loosely based on the 1934 film Death Takes a Holiday, an adaptation of the 1924 Italian play La morte in vacanza by Alberto Casella.

Plot
Media mogul Bill Parrish is contemplating a merger with another media giant. Meanwhile, his eldest daughter, Alison, is planning an elaborate 65th birthday party for him. His younger daughter Susan, a resident in internal medicine, has a relationship with Drew, one of Bill's board members.

Considering marriage, as Bill sees Susan is not deeply in love, he suggests she wait to be swept off of her feet, suggesting "lightning could strike". When the company helicopter lands, he hears a mysterious voice, which he tries to ignore. Arriving in his office, Bill has sharp pains in his chest and hears the voice again, saying, "Yes."

While studying in a coffee shop, Susan meets a vibrant young man who also says "lightning may strike" a relationship between them. Stunned, she departs without getting his name. Unbeknownst to her, directly afterward, he is struck fatally by multiple cars.

That evening, Bill hears the voice again and it summons him so Bill meets him alone in a room. Slowly materializing, it identifies itself as Death and is now in the body of the young man. Death explains that his impassioned speech to his daughter piqued his interest. Given Bill's "competence, experience, and wisdom", Death says that for as long as Bill will be his guide on Earth, Bill will not have to die. They both return to the dinner table and under pressure to make an introduction, clumsily make up a name for Death, introducing him to the family as "Joe Black." Joe Black, having no sophisticated human qualities, doesn't seem to know how to drink or eat, or how to use food and utensils. He later wanders through the palatial house to adapt. Susan tries to understand his intentions, noting that his character is not the same as that of the man she met in the coffee shop.

Bill fails to keep events from going rapidly out of his control. Drew secretly conspires with Parrish Communications, capitalizing on Bill's strange behavior and reliance on Joe to convince the board of directors to vote Bill out as chairman. Using information from Bill's son-in-law, Quince, Drew pushes for merger approval which Bill now opposes.

Intrigued by Joe's naivete, Susan sees he's very different from the young man she met in the coffee shop. She falls deeply in love, while Joe is now under the influence of human desires and a magnetic attraction to her, and they make love. After they dress, Joe asks Susan, "What do we do now?" She replies, "It'll come to us." Bill inadvertently walks in and sees them kissing.

Bill angrily confronts Joe about his relationship with his daughter. He then suggests to Susan that Joe won't  be around much longer. At Susan's hospital, Joe interacts with a terminally ill old woman who wishes to die. Understanding who he is, when he tells her he loves Susan, they discuss the meaning of life and she helps him understand he is dangerously meshing two worlds. When Joe asks her if she is ready to go, she accedes.

As Bill's birthday arrives, Joe declares his intention to take Susan with him. Bill pleads with Joe to recognize the meaning of true love, especially honesty and sacrifice, and to not steal Susan's life. 

At the party, knowing his death is imminent, Bill makes peace with his daughters. Susan tells Joe she has loved him since the day in the coffee shop and he hints that his time is coming to an end. Realizing Susan loves the unknown man, not him, crushes him. He doesn't tell her who he really is, but she seems to intuit something mystical about his identity. Struggling to comprehend the magnitude of their attraction, Susan refuses to recognize Joe as Death. He says "You know who I am". She sputters, "You're... you're Joe." He promises, "You will always have what you found in the coffee shop... I'll love you always." Joe realizes he must set aside his own desire and allow Susan to live her life. 

Quince apologizes to Bill for undermining the company, and Bill forgives him. Joe helps Bill regain control of his company, exposing Drew's underhanded business dealings to the board by claiming to be an agent of the Internal Revenue Service and threatening to put Drew in jail.

In their father/daughter dance, Susan and Bill say goodbye. Fireworks begin, and on a hilltop above the party, Joe waits with tears in his eyes. Bill heads up to him, and they share their thoughts. Bill asks Joe if he should be afraid. He replies, "Not a man like you." As the fireworks explode in the distance, Susan watches Joe and her father cross a bridge at the top of the hill and descend out of sight on the other side.

Susan stands stunned as "Joe" reappears alone and bewildered. He is again the young man from the coffee shop, uninjured and not comprehending where he is. Susan intuits that her father is gone, and the magnetism that she had shared with this young man has returned. "What do we do now?" she asks. "It'll come to us," he replies, as they descend hand-in-hand toward the party.

Cast

 Brad Pitt as Death / "Joe Black"
 also the young man in the coffee shop who is borrowed by Death
 Anthony Hopkins as Bill Parrish
 Claire Forlani as Susan Parrish
 Jake Weber as Drew
 Marcia Gay Harden as Allison Parrish
 Jeffrey Tambor as Quince, Allison's husband
 David S. Howard as Eddie Sloane
 Lois Kelly Miller as Jamaican Woman
 Marylouise Burke as Lillian
 June Squibb as Helen

Production

Filming 
Most of William Parrish's country mansion scenes were shot at the Aldrich Mansion in Rhode Island.

The penthouse interiors and Parrish Communications offices were sets built at the 14th Regiment Armory in the South Slope neighborhood in Brooklyn, New York.

The place where Susan and the Young Man from the Coffee Shop first meet is Broadway Restaurant, at 2664 Broadway and West 101st Street, Manhattan.

Versions 
A two-hour version was made to show on television and airline flights, by cutting most of the plotline involving Bill Parrish's business. Since Brest derided this edit of his film and disowned it, the director's credit was changed to the Hollywood pseudonym Alan Smithee.

Reception

Box office
Meet Joe Black opened on November 13, 1998, and grossed $15,017,995 domestically upon its opening weekend (11/13-15) at #3, behind The Waterboys second weekend and the opening of I Still Know What You Did Last Summer.

While the film had a disappointing domestic box office return of $44,619,100, it fared much better internationally. Taking in an additional $98,321,000, the movie grossed a worldwide total of $142,940,100.

As Meet Joe Black was one of the few films showing the first trailer for Star Wars: Episode I – The Phantom Menace, it was reported that droves of Star Wars fans bought tickets for the film, only to leave after the trailer showed.

Critical response
Meet Joe Black received mixed reviews from critics, with most complimenting the performances but criticizing the film's three-hour length, the slow pacing and the screenplay. Roger Ebert gave it three stars, but disliked the peripheral story lines and overly drawn-out ending. He concluded that despite its flaws, "there's so much that's fine in this movie". Peter Travers of Rolling Stone wrote that most of the characters were one-dimensional. Anthony Hopkins received uniform praise for his performance, with Travers opining that Hopkins' Bill Parrish was the only fully realized character in the film; Mick LaSalle wrote that "Hopkins' acting is so emotionally full that the tiniest moments...ring with complexities of thought and feeling." Brad Pitt, on the other hand, received a mixed response, with LaSalle's calling the performance so bad "it hurts" and James Berardinelli's calling it "execrable".

Meet Joe Black earned a Razzie Award nomination for Worst Remake.

On Rotten Tomatoes, the film holds an approval rating of a 45% based on 49 reviews, with an average score of 5.60/10. The website's critical consensus reads, "Meet Joe Black is pretty to look at and benefits from an agreeable cast, but that isn't enough to offset this dawdling drama's punishing three-hour runtime." On Metacritic, the film received a score of 43 based on 24 reviews, indicating "mixed or average reviews". Audiences surveyed by CinemaScore gave the film a grade "A−" on scale of A to F.

References

External links

 
 
 

1998 films
1990s fantasy drama films
1998 romantic drama films
Remakes of American films
American romantic drama films
American romantic fantasy films
1990s English-language films
American fantasy drama films
Films about mass media owners
Films credited to Alan Smithee
Films directed by Martin Brest
Films scored by Thomas Newman
Films shot in New Jersey
Films shot in New York City
Films shot in Rhode Island
Films about the upper class
Love stories
Films about personifications of death
Films with screenplays by Bo Goldman
Universal Pictures films
Films with screenplays by Kevin Wade
1990s American films